United States gubernatorial elections were held in four states. Kentucky and Mississippi held their general elections on November 4. Louisiana held the first round of its jungle primary on October 4 and the runoff on November 15. In addition, California held a recall election on October 7.

The Republican Party had a net gain of two seats in 2003, picking up an open seat in Kentucky, removing a Democratic governor in California, and defeating a Democratic governor in Mississippi, while losing an open seat to the Democrats in Louisiana. The election cycle was unusual because every seat up for election changed hands. This was the last time a party made net gains in this cycle of gubernatorial elections until 2019.

Election results

Closest races 
States where the margin of victory was under 5%:
 Louisiana, 3.9%

States where the margin of victory was under 10%:
 Mississippi, 6.8%

See also 

2003 California gubernatorial recall election

2003 Kentucky gubernatorial election

2003 Louisiana gubernatorial election

2003 Mississippi gubernatorial election

Notes

External links
Mississippi Certified Election Results
California Election Results CA Secretary of State Site